The Catch II was the winning touchdown reception in a 1998 NFC Wild Card Game played between the Green Bay Packers and San Francisco 49ers at 3Com Park at Candlestick Point on January 3, 1999, as part of the 1998–99 NFL playoffs following the 1998 NFL season. With 8 seconds left in the game and the 49ers facing 3rd-and-3, San Francisco wide receiver Terrell Owens made a catch in the end zone to complete a 25-yard touchdown pass from quarterback Steve Young, enabling the 49ers to defeat the Packers, 30–27. It came at the end of a 9-play, 76-yard drive engineered by Young. This game and moment mirrors a similar catch in 49ers lore, when quarterback Joe Montana threw to receiver Dwight Clark in the 1981–82 NFL playoffs, and is similarly regarded as one of the most memorable events in National Football League (NFL) history, and a significant moment in Owens' NFL career.

Game summary 
The 49ers' first drive ended in a fumble, recovered by Green Bay. From their own 47-yard line, Brett Favre's offense drove the ball 48 yards downfield, capped off by a 23-yard field goal by Ryan Longwell, for the first points of the game. The next San Francisco possession ended in a punt, but the offense was able to get the ball back after a forced fumble by safety Merton Hanks on Green Bay running back Dorsey Levens. From the Packers' 19-yard line, Young completed a 3-play, 19-yard drive for a touchdown, capped off by a 1-yard Greg Clark reception to put the score at 7–3.

Favre completed a 2-yard touchdown pass to Antonio Freeman to start the 2nd quarter. On the next 49ers' possession, Young was intercepted by Darren Sharper, but Green Bay quickly punted the ball back after a three-and-out. San Francisco's next drive ended in a 34-yard Wade Richey field goal to tie the score at 10–10. Green Bay's next possession ended in a missed field goal by Longwell at the 49ers' 32-yard line. Later in the quarter, Young was intercepted again, this time by George Koonce at the Green Bay 17. From there, Favre's offense went on a 7-play, 83-yard touchdown drive, capped off by a Levens 2-yard run, to put the score at 17–10.

With 11:32 to play in the 3rd quarter, Favre was intercepted by Lee Woodall at midfield. From the Green Bay 33, Young's offense went on a 5-play, 33-yard drive, capped off by an 8-yard touchdown catch by Clark to tie the game at 17–17. After another three-and-out from the Packers, San Francisco took over at their own 22-yard line. From there, the 49ers' drive ended in a 48-yard field goal by Richey at the Packers' 33 to put the score at 20–17.

In the 4th quarter, the scoring started with a 37-yard Longwell field goal to tie the game at 20–20. However, the 49ers quickly answered back with a 40-yard Richey field goal to put the score at 23–20. On the first play with the ball back, Favre was intercepted by Darnell Walker, but the 49ers' offense quickly went three-and-out. From their own 11, Favre led the Packers on a 9-play, 89-yard touchdown drive, capped off by a 15-yard catch by Freeman, to put the score at 27–23.

Missed fumble 
During the 49ers' final drive, on their 5th play from scrimmage, Young passed complete to Jerry Rice for a gain of 6 yards to the Packers' 47. However, on the tackle by Bernardo Harris, a clear fumble was forced that was not seen by the officials. On the Fox television broadcast replay, the ball appeared to be forced out of Rice's hand, punched out by safety Scott McGarrahan, before Rice's knee hit the ground. At the time of this game, instant replay rules were not instated in the NFL, in which the play could be easily challenged and overturned, giving Green Bay the ball.

Owens' struggles 
The biggest story of the game would be Terrell Owens and his struggles on offense. On the 3rd play of the game, Owens caught Young's pass for an 11-yard gain, but fumbled the ball into the hands of Pat Terrell at the Green Bay 47-yard line. Continuing into the 2nd quarter, Owens would miss 2 passes by Young, including what would have been an easy catch at the 47-yard line. In the 3rd quarter, Owens would miss another 2 passes, including a wide open pass into the end zone. Though Owens would make a reception for 34 yards in the 4th quarter, he would drop yet another pass later on. Owens, on his performance up to this point, after the game would describe it thus: "I let the team down. I was horrible."

The play 

Facing 3rd and 3 with eight seconds to go left in the game, the 49ers lined up at the Green Bay 25-yard line. From the snap, Young almost stumbled and fell, but regained his balance. He then fired the ball down the middle to Owens, who was between five Packers defenders, catching the ball in the end zone near the goal line for the touchdown reception with three seconds left to play. Owens, securing the victory after a terrible offensive game, was overcome with emotion as he hugged head coach Steve Mariucci on the sidelines while in tears. After the game, Owens reflected on the catch, saying, "I was just happy I caught the ball. I knew I had to come back and make a big play after all those drops. I let the team down in the beginning, but luckily I got to come back and make a big play in the end." Coach Mariucci would add, "[Owens] was beside himself. I couldn't tell if he was hurt or crying. It was just very emotional."

On the ensuing kickoff, Roell Preston was able to return the ball to his team's own 45-yard line, but would fumble out of bounds as time expired, giving the 49ers the victory over the Packers, 30–27. Owens would finish the game with three receptions for 73 yards. Steve Young finished with a statline of 18-of-32 for 182 yards with three touchdowns and two interceptions for San Francisco while Brett Favre went 20-of-35 for 292 yards with two touchdowns and two interceptions for Green Bay.

Broadcast calls 
For Fox Sports, John Madden and Pat Summerall described the play on TV:

Joe Starkey calling the play for the 49ers Radio Network on KGO-AM:

Box score

49ers' final drive

Officials 
Referee: Gerald Austin (#34)
Umpire: James Duke (#74)
Head Linesman: Earnie Frantz (#111)
Line Judge: Jeff Bergman (#32)
Field Judge: Keven Mack (#102)
Side Judge: Rick Patterson (#15)
Back Judge: Don Hakes (#96)

Aftermath 
The game would be Holmgren's last as Packers head coach, and the last for Green Bay in the playoffs until 2001.

In the NFC Divisional round, the 49ers faced the Atlanta Falcons. Near the end of the game, Young ran the ball into the end zone for an 8-yard touchdown. On the extra point attempt, backup quarterback Ty Detmer fumbled the snap, but recovered and threw it to Greg Clark for a 2-point conversion with 2:57 left to play in the game. The 49ers forced a punt, but Dan Stryzinski pinned them back at their own 4-yard line with 34 seconds and no timeouts left. Young completed a 24-yard pass to Levy on the second play after that, but on the next play, a William White interception at midfield sealed the victory for the Falcons, 20–18.

Replay rule change 
Following the Jerry Rice missed fumble, outcry rippled throughout the NFL and the Packers organization for the league to institute a new instant replay review system. Packers general manager Ron Wolf said about the NFL's missed calls, "It's time we do something about it in the NFL. To turn a game around like this...I'm not alone in this. This is not the regular season and next week you can strap it on and play again. We have to go home now."

Even though the NFL previously used a review system from 1986 to 1991, during the 1999 off-season, the league implemented a new "challenge" system, which is still in use today. Coaches are allowed two challenges per game before the final two minutes of each half to notify officials of a missed call: a lost challenge costs the team one available timeout, while a correct costs none. After the two-minute warning of both halves, and in overtime, all reviews will be initiated by the replay assistant in the press box replay booth, as many times as necessary. Though, before the 2006 season, an electronic pager was used instead of the modern-day challenge flag.

Legacy 
The Catch II would go down in 49ers–Packers playoff history, as a culmination of San Francisco finally winning their many postseason meetings in the '90s. In December 2003, the game was featured as an episode of NFL's Greatest Games. In June 2020, NBC Sports Bay Area put it at No. 12 in a top 20 list of great 49ers plays. As for Owens, the moment was one of his first memorable plays with the 49ers that would eventually lead to a hall-of-fame NFL career. Reflecting on the play in July 2019, Owens said, "I don’t know where I would be if it weren’t for that play to be honest. If you take that one catch, that one touchdown away from me, I don’t know where I would be. It was a play that really catapulted my career.”

14 years later, another version of "The Catch" would go down in 49ers lore, this time in the 2011 NFC Divisional Playoffs against the New Orleans Saints. Once again, with San Francisco trailing late in the game, and facing a 3rd down and 3 situation in the opponent's red zone, 49ers quarterback Alex Smith connected with tight end Vernon Davis in the end zone for the game winning touchdown reception with 9 seconds left to go in the game, giving San Francisco the victory over the Saints, 36–32. Because of the commemorative timing of the Montana–Clark and Young–Owens catches and the coincidence that all 3 legendary catches occurred in the playoffs in Candlestick Park, with the 49ers trailing late, facing a 3rd-and-3 in the opponent's red zone, giving them the eventual victory, the catch from Smith to Davis would be thereafter immortalized by 49ers fans and sports writers as The Catch III.

See also 
 The Catch – a similar game winning touchdown catch for the 49ers

References

External links 
 
 Pro Football Reference page for the game

1998 National Football League season
National Football League playoff games
American football incidents
Green Bay Packers postseason
San Francisco 49ers postseason
1999 in San Francisco
January 1999 sports events in the United States
1999 in sports in California
Candlestick Park